The Journal of the San Juan Islands is a newspaper based in Friday Harbor, Washington. The Journal publishes on Wednesdays. It also publishes SanJuanJournal.com; Springtide, an annual magazine for visitors; The Book of the San Juan Islands, an annual almanac; and special sections related to aspects of island life.

The Journal was adjudged a legal newspaper for the publication of any and all legal notices on May 6, 1941 by the San Juan County Superior Court.

As of 2013, the economy of the San Juans is almost entirely driven by tourism, which has been described as a "thin base for newspaper endeavors."

Early history
The Journal was founded by Oscar G. Wall, with the first issue publishing on Sept. 13, 1906. Wall relocated to Friday Harbor from Lanesboro, Minnesota, where he had published a newspaper and, from 1878-1885, served on the village council.

Originally named the Friday Harbor Journal, Wall launched the newspaper with a stated ambition of helping the thinly populated San Juan archipelago to improve beyond a largely farming- and fishing-based economy. The motto of The Journal in its early days was, “A Square Deal for Everybody."

The Journal was bought in 1907 by its editor, Virgil Frits (1882-1971), who owned, edited and published it until 1958 (Wall died in Friday Harbor on Aug. 16, 1911 at the age of 67 ). Frits was also a longtime town clerk of Friday Harbor. The Journal's competitor, the San Juan Islander, folded in 1914.

During Frits' ownership, The Journal was located in the building next to the San Juan County Bank building, which is now the home of Coldwell Banker. The Journal's historic home is now a retail shop.

The present title was adopted in 1981.

1990s and 2000s
On Oct. 2, 1998, The Journal launched its online news site, SanJuanJournal.com, which gradually expanded to daily news coverage. For much of the first decade of the 2000s, SanJuanJournal.com had more unique visitors than any other online news site in the San Juan Islands.

In 2000, The Journal — which was locally published and locally managed — was a pawn in a fraud involving its owner. At that time, The Journal was part of Lower Mainland Publishing Co., a subsidiary of Hollinger International, which Conrad Black and his associate David Radler controlled. Black and Radler arranged for Hollinger to sell The Journal and the Skagit Valley Argus, on May 1, 2000, to Horizon Publications, a company which they secretly owned, for the sum of $1. Horizon sold The Journal the following year to Black Press (an unrelated firm) for $280,000. The directors of Hollinger were not informed of a previous third-party offer of $750,000 for The Journal alone.

The Journal has been owned since September 2001 by Sound Publishing, Inc., a division of Black Press and the largest community newspaper publisher in Washington.

Between 1999 and 2011, The Journal regularly won awards for General Excellence and Community Service in the Washington Newspaper Publishers Association Better Newspapers Contest; in 2003, it won first place for General Excellence and first and third place for Community Service. In 2006, The Journal's editor won Best Feature Writer and Best Editorial Columnist honors from the Washington Newspaper Publishers Association and the Washington Press Association.

Beginning in 2000, the Journal had a new competitor in SanJuanIslander.com, which took its name from the late 19th century/early 20th century newspaper. The online news site was founded by two former Journal employees, Sharon Kivisto and Matt Pranger.

In 2014, The Journal won 17 awards in the Washington Newspaper Publishers Association Better Newspapers Contest.

Editors
Editors of The Journal include:

1900s-1950s
Oscar G. Wall (1906-1907)
Virgil Frits (1907-1958)

1960-1970s
Jim Fred Lehde (1960s)
Larry Duthie (1970s)

1980s-present
William Ristow (1981-1983)
Allison Arthur (February 1983-April 1994)
Dennis Anstine (1995-1997)
Matt Pranger (1997-1999)
Richard Walker (November 1999-January 2011)
Scott Rasmussen (January 2011-September 2015)
Cali Bagby (September 2015-May 2019)
Mandi Johnson (May 2019-December 2021)
Heather Spaudling (February 2022 – present)

In addition, Jo Bailey (1928-2017), author of several noted cruising guides, among them "Gunkholing in the San Juan Islands," was editor of the Journal's first Springtide magazine.

Noted columnists
Virgil and Maude Frits, "Friday Harbor in a Nutshell": a column about local happenings, and comings and goings.
Tony Surina, "A Look Back — From the Pages of The Journal": news items from 50 and 90 years earlier, culled from The Journal's archived editions.
Howard Schonberger, "Ferry Home Companion": local slice-of-life column.

Archives
The Journal's archives were donated in 2002 to the San Juan Historical Museum. They are available to review upon appointment. The archives include bound editions of The Journal dating to its earliest editions; bound editions of the San Juan Islander newspaper; and the paste-up boards containing camera-ready pages of journalist Lucile McDonald's 1990 book, "Making History: The People Who Shaped the San Juan Islands," which was published by The Journal's now-defunct printing plant in Friday Harbor.

Extra editions
During the 2000s, The Journal — which is printed on the mainland — produced several extra editions using a high-quality copier in its office. The extras were distributed by hand and in stores, and were offered for free. Several election-night extras were produced. An extra was produced on May 9, 2002, when a devastating fire consumed nearly an entire block of downtown Friday Harbor; the edition also provided information on how residents could help in the recovery effort. The Journal also produced The Daily Fair, a free, four-page newspaper, during the San Juan County Fair; The Journal's booth at the fairgrounds served as a news bureau during the countywide fair.

Journalism education
From 2000-2010, the Journal conducted several programs for young journalists: 1) Internships. 2) Election-night reporting for the Associated Press. 3) Voices, a newspaper produced by teens for teens. 4) The Underground, the student newspaper for Friday Harbor High School. 5) The Virgil Frits Award for the year's outstanding student journalist. 6) A $1,000 scholarship for a graduating senior who planned to major in journalism.

Three program participants went on to journalism careers. One, Colleen Smith, is group publisher of The Journal, the Islands' Sounder (Orcas Island), and the Islands Weekly (Lopez Island).

Books by former Journal employees
"Gunkholing in the Gulf Islands," by Jo Bailey, co-author (1986, Robert Hale & Co.).
"Gunkholing in Desolation Sound and Princess Louisa," by Jo Bailey, co-author (1989, Robert Hale & Co.).
"Gunkholing in South Puget Sound," by Jo Bailey, co-author (1997, San Juan Enterprises).
"Gunkholing in the San Juan Islands," by Jo Bailey, co-author (2000, San Juan Enterprises).
"Mahini Tiare, Pacific Passages," by Barbara Marrett, co-author (1993, Pacific International Publishing). 
"Roche Harbor," by Richard Walker (2009, Arcadia Publishing).
"The Journey Home," by Richard Walker (2012, Red Bird Chapbooks).
"Indian Country Stylebook for Editors, Writers and Journalists," by Richard Walker, co-author (2016, Kitsap Publishing).
"Paxton the Sheepdog Who Couldn't ...", by Jane K. Fox (2017, Waterstones).
"Point No Point," by Richard Walker (2019, Arcadia Publishing).
"Revelations," by Richard Arlin Walker (2020, Deer Dancer Press).

References

External links
Journal of the San Juan Islands

Newspapers published in Washington (state)
Publications established in 1906
Weekly newspapers published in the United States
1906 establishments in Washington (state)
San Juan Islands